The 2021 FIM Women's Motocross World Championship was the 17th Women's Motocross World Championship season. Courtney Duncan successfully defended her title, after taking her second title in 2020.

2021 Calendar
A 5-round calendar for the 2021 season was announced on 10 February 2021.

Participants

Riders Championship

Manufacturers Championship

References 

Motocross World Championship seasons
Motocross
2021